St. Vincent is the fourth studio album by American musician St. Vincent. It was released on February 24, 2014, in the United Kingdom and a day later in the United States, through Loma Vista Recordings and Republic Records. Produced by John Congleton, it features collaborations with Sharon Jones & the Dap-Kings drummer Homer Steinweiss and Midlake drummer McKenzie Smith. The tracks were arranged and demoed by Annie Clark in Austin, Texas and recorded at the Elmwood studio in Dallas.

Critically acclaimed on its release, the album won a 2015 Grammy Award for Best Alternative Music Album, making St. Vincent only the second female solo artist to win the award since its inception in 1991, when it was awarded to Sinéad O'Connor. It peaked at No. 12 in the Billboard 200 and the UK Albums Chart at No. 21, selling nearly 30,000 copies in its first week.

Background

Release
St. Vincent was announced on December 9, 2013, and "Birth in Reverse" was released for free download. A second single, "Digital Witness", was released on January 6, 2014. An additional release of "Digital Witness", featuring "Del Rio" as a B-side, was released in the United Kingdom on January 24, 2014.

A music video directed by Chino Moya was released on January 31, 2014 for "Digital Witness". On February 5, Clark debuted "Prince Johnny" on the radio show KCRW: Morning Becomes Eclectic. On February 9, Clark debuted songs at fashion designer Diane von Fürstenberg's runway show for New York's Fashion Week. A music video directed by Willo Perron was released on December 16, 2014 for "Birth In Reverse".

St. Vincent entered the US Billboard 200 albums chart at No. 12 and the UK Albums Chart at No. 21, becoming St. Vincent's highest charting album in both countries. The album sold nearly 30,000 copies in its first week.

A deluxe edition was released on February 9, 2015 in the U.K. with the album being available only for digital download in the U.S. on February 10. It featured the previously unreleased "Bad Believer"; "Del Rio", a B-side from the "Digital Witness" single and a bonus track on the Japanese edition of St. Vincent; "Digital Witness" (DARKSIDE Remix), previously released as a single; and "Pietà" and "Sparrow", originally released together on a limited edition 10" pink vinyl on November 28, 2014 for Record Store Day.

Music 
Clark described St. Vincent as "a party record you could play at a funeral." The opening "Rattlesnake" is about an experience Clark had when walking in the desert, which she described as a "commune with nature". However, the opening line "I followed the power lines back from the road", suggests that Clark is separating herself from her dependency on artificial or digital power.

Other songs have more personal connections. "I Prefer Your Love", the sixth track, is about Clark's mother, who was briefly ill. The closing "Severed Crossed Fingers" takes inspiration from a line from one of American novelist Lorrie Moore's short stories. The sentence from which the title is taken – "He thinks of severed, crossed fingers found perfectly survived in the wreckage of a local plane crash last year", – is used by Clark to demonstrate the human heart's ability to have hope, even when none is present. Clark said of the song, "That one's all me" in an interview with Studio 360. Later, in an interview with Pitchfork, Clark explained "I sang that in one fucking take, cried my eyes out, and the song was done".

Clark said she felt St. Vincent was "more confident. I'm extending a hand; I want to connect with people. Strange Mercy, which is a record I'm proud of, [was] definitely a very accurate record of my life at a certain time, but it was more about self-laceration, all the sort of internal struggle. St. Vincent is very extroverted."

Critical reception

The album has received widespread critical acclaim. On the review aggregate site Metacritic, it scored an average score of 89 out of 100, based on 40 independent reviews, indicating "universal acclaim". AnyDecentMusic? collated reviews giving the album an average score of 8.6 based upon 40 reviews. This score makes the record part of AnyDecentMusic?'s All-Time Top 10 albums. Writing for The Guardian, Alexis Petridis awarded the album a perfect five stars, calling it "an embarrassment of fantastic songs" and "a straightforward triumph".

At Rolling Stone, Jon Dolan awarded the album four stars out of five, hailing it as "her tightest, tensest, best set of songs to date, with wry, twisty beats pushing her lovably ornery melodies toward grueling revelations" and noting that "the playful way these songs contort makes pain feel like a party." Alex Denny of The Fly rated the album four-and-a-half stars out of five, describing it as "her most ebullient, ambitiously styled music to date". NME, The Guardian, musicOMH, Entertainment Weekly, and Slant Magazine named it the best album of 2014.

Accolades 

St. Vincent won Best Alternative Music Album at the 57th Grammy Awards in 2015.

Track listing 
All songs written by Annie Clark.

Personnel 
Credits are adapted from the St. Vincent liner notes.

Musicians
 Annie Clark – vocals, guitar
 Daniel Mintseris – synthesizer (tracks 1, 3–8, 10–15), piano (tracks 4, 7), harpsichord (track 11)
 Bobby Sparks – Minimoog (tracks 1–8, 10–15)
 Homer Steinweiss – drums (tracks 1, 3–6, 10, 13–15)
 McKenzie Smith – drums (tracks 2, 7–9, 11, 12)
 Adam Pickrell – Minimoog (track 9), keyboards (tracks 8, 9)
 Ralph Carney – horns (track 5)

Production
 John Congleton – production, recording, mixing
 Greg Calbi – mastering

Design
 Willo Perron – creative direction
 Brian Roettinger – design
 Renata Raksha – photography

Charts

Weekly charts

Year-end charts

Release history

References

External links 
 
 

2014 albums
Art rock albums by American artists
Albums produced by John Congleton
Grammy Award for Best Alternative Music Album
Noise pop albums
Republic Records albums
St. Vincent (musician) albums